Myrddin Wyllt (—"Myrddin the Wild") is a figure in medieval Welsh legend. In Middle Welsh poetry he is accounted a chief bard, the speaker of several poems in The Black Book of Carmarthen and The Red Book of Hergest. He is called Wyllt—"the Wild"—by Elis Gruffydd, and elsewhere Myrddin Emrys ("Ambrosius"), Merlinus Caledonensis ("of Caledonia") or Merlin Sylvestris ("of the woods").
Myrddin Wylt was born in 540 CE.

Although his legend centres on a known Celtic theme, Myrddin's legend is rooted in history, for he is said to have gone mad after the Battle of Arfderydd at Arthuret at which Rhydderch Hael of Strathclyde defeated the Brythonic king Gwenddoleu. According to the Annales Cambriae this took place in 573. Myrddin fled into the forest, lived with the beasts and received the gift of prophecy.

Myrddin Wyllt's legend closely resembles that of a north-British figure called Lailoken, which appears in Jocelyn of Furness' 12th-century Life of Kentigern. Scholars differ as to the independence or identity of Lailoken and Myrddin, though there is more agreement as to Myrddin's original independence from later Welsh legends.

Myrddin's grave is reputed to lie near the River Tweed in the village of Drumelzier near Peebles, although nothing remains above ground level at the site.

In Welsh literature 
The earliest (pre-12th century) Welsh poems about the Myrddin legend present him as a madman living an existence in the Caledonian Forest. He was born in 540. In the forest he ruminates on his former existence and the events of the Battle of Arfderydd, where Riderch Hael, King of Alt Clut (Strathclyde) slaughtered the forces of Gwenddoleu ap Ceidio, and Myrddin went mad watching this defeat. The Annales Cambriae date this battle to 573, naming Gwenddoleu's adversaries as the sons of Eliffer, presumably Gwrgi and Peredur. This battle, the subsequent assassination of Urien Rheged and the defeat of the Gododdin at Catraeth are cited as reasons for the collapse of the alliance of early British kingdoms in the north before the Angles, Scots and Picts.

Welsh historian John Edward Lloyd suggests there were three traditions that were conflated. The first, “Merlinus Ambrosius” (the Arthurian Merlin), identified by Giraldus Cambrensis as Myrddin Emrys —the Welsh form of Ambrosius—, who was found at Carmarthen and prophesied before Vortigern. The second, “Merlinus Silvester” or “Merlinus Caledonius” who came from the North (Alba) and was a contemporary of Arthur, saw a horrible portent in the sky while fighting in a battle and spent the rest of his days a madman in the woods. The third one is “Myrddin Wyllt”, whom Lloyd identifies with the Lailoken mentioned in Jocelyn of Furness' Life of St. Kentigern.

Although Lailoken is identified with Merlin in the late 15th-century Lailoken and Kentigern, the alternative name may already have been present in the Middle Welsh poem Dialogue of Myrddin with his twin sister Gwendydd (also named Gwenddydd or Languoreth), for she addresses him several times as Llallwg, for which the diminutive would be Llallwgan.

A version of this legend is preserved in the late-15th-century Lailoken and Kentigern. In this narrative St. Kentigern meets a naked, hairy madman called Lailoken, said by some to be called Merlynum or Merlin, in a deserted place. He has been condemned for his sins to wander in the company of beasts, having been the cause of the deaths of all of the persons killed in the battle fought on the plain between Liddel and Carwannok. Having told his story, the madman leaps up and flees from the presence of the saint back into the wilderness. He appears several times more in the narrative until at last asking St. Kentigern for the Sacrament, prophesying that he was about to die a triple death. After some hesitation, the saint grants the madman's wish, and later that day the shepherds of King Meldred capture him, beat him with clubs, then cast him into the river Tweed where his body is pierced by a stake, thus fulfilling his prophecy.

Legend has it that second part of Carmarthen's name (in Welsh -fyrddin) was derived from Myrddin and identified his place of birth. However, when Britannia was a Roman province, Carmarthen was the civitas capital of the Demetae tribe, known as Moridunum (from Brittonic *mori-dunon meaning "sea fort"), and this is the true source of the town's name. Celticist A. O. H. Jarman suggests that instead the name Myrddin was derived from Carmarthen's name.

Welsh literature has examples of a prophetic literature, predicting the military victory of all of the Celtic peoples of Great Britain who will join and drive the English – and later the Normans – back into the sea. Some of these works were presented as prophecies of Myrddin. The Armes Prydein (one of the earliest mentions of him) contains the line “Myrddin foretells that they will meet”. The tradition was apparently shared with Cornish literature, however only a single Latin translation of a lost Cornish-language original Prophecy of Merlin exists in the Vatican library by John of Cornwall.
In The Black Book of Carmarthen there are the poems Yr Afallennau and Yr Oianau that describe Myrddin talking to an apple tree and a pig, prophesying the success or failure of the Welsh army in battles with the Normans in South Wales.

Clas Myrddin, or Merlin's Enclosure, is an early name for Great Britain stated in the Third Series of Welsh Triads.

Geoffrey of Monmouth 
The modern depiction of Merlin began with Geoffrey of Monmouth, who portrayed Merlin as a prophet and a madman, and introduced him into Arthurian legend. Geoffrey of Monmouth popularised Merlin the wizard, associated with the town of Carmarthen in South Wales. His book Prophetiae Merlini was intended to be a collection of the prophecies of the Welsh figure of Myrddin, whom he called Merlin. He included the Prophetiae in his more famous second work, the Historia Regum Britanniae. In this work, however, he constructed an account of Merlin's life that placed him in the time of  Ambrosius Aurelianus and King Arthur, decades before the lifetime of Myrddin Wyllt. He also attached to him an episode originally ascribed to Ambrosius, and others that appear to be of his own invention.

Geoffrey later wrote the Vita Merlini, an account based more closely on the earlier Welsh stories about Myrddin and his experiences at Arfderyd, and explained that the action was taking place long after Merlin's involvement with Arthur. However, the Vita Merlini did not prove popular enough to counter the version of Merlin in the Historia, which went on to influence most later accounts of the character.

References

Sources 
Seymour, Camilla & Randall, John (2007) Stobo Kirk: a guide to the building and its history. Peebles: John Randall
Tolstoy, Nikolai (1985) The Quest for Merlin. 
Morris, John (gen. ed.) (1980) Arthurian Period Sources volume 8, Phillimore & Co, Chichester (includes full text of The Annales Cambriae & Nennius)
Phillimore, Egerton (1888), "The Annales Cambriae and Old Welsh Genealogies, from Harleian MS. 3859", in Phillimore, Egerton, Y Cymmrodor, IX, Honourable Society of Cymmrodorion, pp. 141 – 183.

External links 

 The Vita Merlini; translated by John Jay Parry
 Welsh poem: Dialogue between Myrddin and his sister Gwendydd

Arthurian legend
Britons of the North
Merlin
Arthurian characters
540 births
6th-century deaths
Sub-Roman writers
Prophets